Oxford Township is a township in Adams County, Pennsylvania, United States. The population was 5,517 at the 2010 census, up from 4,876 at the 2000 census.

Geography
The township is in eastern Adams County and surrounds the borough of New Oxford. U.S. Route 30, the Lincoln Highway, passes through the township and through New Oxford, leading east to York and west to Gettysburg.

Demographics

As of the census of 2000, there were 4,876 people, 1,694 households, and 1,233 families residing in the township.  The population density was 500.7 people per square mile (193.3/km2).  There were 1,753 housing units at an average density of 180.0/sq mi (69.5/km2).  The racial makeup of the township was 94.93% White, 0.47% African American, 0.12% Native American, 0.47% Asian, 0.08% Pacific Islander, 3.10% from other races, and 0.82% from two or more races. Hispanic or Latino of any race were 4.90% of the population.

There were 1,694 households, out of which 33.7% had children under the age of 18 living with them, 60.0% were married couples living together, 8.3% had a female householder with no husband present, and 27.2% were non-families. 23.3% of all households were made up of individuals, and 14.8% had someone living alone who was 65 years of age or older.  The average household size was 2.62 and the average family size was 3.07.

In the township the population was spread out, with 24.2% under the age of 18, 6.0% from 18 to 24, 27.7% from 25 to 44, 17.4% from 45 to 64, and 24.7% who were 65 years of age or older.  The median age was 40 years. For every 100 females there were 87.0 males.  For every 100 females age 18 and over, there were 81.4 males.

The median income for a household in the township was $42,041, and the median income for a family was $49,969. Males had a median income of $34,724 versus $19,666 for females. The per capita income for the township was $17,175.  About 1.4% of families and 4.3% of the population were below the poverty line, including 2.7% of those under age 18 and 4.8% of those age 65 or over.

References

Populated places established in 1749
Townships in Adams County, Pennsylvania
Townships in Pennsylvania